Luis Alberti (born 30 October 1981) is a Mexican actor. He studied acting at La Casa del Teatro, and stood out in the film Eisenstein in Guanajuato, 
and later in the Mexican film Encarnación. On television  it was highlighted by series as Rosario Tijeras (2016–2017), and El César (2017), and more recently for playing the Mexican singer José Guadalupe Esparza, in the biographical series Bronco: The Series.

Filmography

Films roles

Television roles

References

External links 
 

1981 births
Best Actor Ariel Award winners
Mexican male television actors
21st-century Mexican male actors
Living people
People from Mexico City